This is a list of public art, including dolmen, on the island of Sylt.

Archsum

Kampen

Keitum

Westerland

Misc 

Sylt
Public art